The San Marino Federal Trophy was a Supercup of association football in San Marino.  The tournament began in 1986. The tournament had four teams: the finalists of the Premier League play-offs and Cup.

The final competition was held in 2011.  It was replaced with the Super Coppa Sammarinese.

Winners

By year
 1986 - La Fiorita
 1987 - La Fiorita
 1988 - Virtus
 1989 - Libertas
 1990 - Domagnano
 1991 - Tre Fiori
 1992 - Libertas
 1993 - Tre Fiori
 1994 - Faetano
 1995 - Cosmos
 1996 - Libertas
 1997 - Folgore
 1998 - Cosmos
 1999 - Cosmos
 2000 - Folgore
 2001 - Domagnano
 2002 - Cailungo
 2003 - Pennarossa
 2004 - Domagnano
 2005 - Tre Penne
 2006 - Murata
 2007 - La Fiorita
 2008 - Murata
 2009 - Murata
 2010 - Tre Fiori
 2011 - Tre Fiori

Performance by club

References

External links
San Marino - List of Cup Winners, RSSSF.com

 
San Marino
Supercup
1986 establishments in San Marino
2011 disestablishments in San Marino
Recurring sporting events established in 1986
Recurring events disestablished in 2011
Defunct sports competitions in San Marino